RMS Olympic was a British ocean liner and the lead ship of the White Star Line's trio of  liners. This included service as a troopship during the First World War, which gained her the nickname Old Reliable. She returned to civilian service after the war, and served successfully as an ocean liner throughout the 1920s and into the first half of the 1930s, although increased competition, and the slump in trade during the Great Depression after 1930, made her operation increasingly unprofitable.

Olympic was the largest ocean liner in the world for two periods during 1910–13, interrupted only by the brief tenure of the slightly larger  (which had the same dimensions but higher gross register tonnage) before the German  went into service in June 1913. Olympic also held the title of the largest British-built liner until  was launched in 1934, interrupted only by the short careers of Titanic and Britannic.

Olympic was withdrawn from service and sold for scrap in 12 April, 1935; demolition was completed in 1937.

The other two ships in the class had short service lives: in 1912, Titanic collided with an iceberg on her maiden voyage and sank in the North Atlantic; Britannic never operated in her intended role as a passenger ship, instead serving as a hospital ship during the First World War until she hit a mine and sank in the Aegean Sea in 1916.

Background and construction 

They were the largest vessels built for the British shipping company White Star Line, which was a fleet of 29 steamers and tenders in 1912. The three ships had their genesis in a discussion in mid-1907 between the White Star Line's chairman, J. Bruce Ismay, and the American financier J. Pierpont Morgan, who controlled the White Star Line's parent corporation, the International Mercantile Marine Co. The White Star Line faced a growing challenge from its main rivals Cunard, which had just launched  and  – the fastest passenger ships then in service – and the German lines Hamburg America and Norddeutscher Lloyd. Ismay preferred to compete on size and economics rather than speed and proposed to commission a new class of liners that would be bigger than anything that had gone before as well as being the last word in comfort and luxury. The former was replaced by Olympic while Majestic was replaced by Titanic. Majestic would be brought back into her old spot on White Star's New York service after Titanics loss.

The ships were constructed by the Belfast shipbuilders Harland and Wolff, who had a long-established relationship with the White Star Line dating back to 1867. Harland and Wolff were given a great deal of latitude in designing ships for the White Star Line; the usual approach was for the latter to sketch out a general concept which the former would take away and turn into a ship design. Cost considerations were relatively low on the agenda and Harland and Wolff was authorised to spend what it needed on the ships, plus a five per cent profit margin. In the case of the Olympic-class ships, a cost of £3 million for the first two ships was agreed plus "extras to contract" and the usual five per cent fee.

Harland and Wolff put their designers to work designing the Olympic-class vessels. It was overseen by Lord Pirrie, a director of both Harland and Wolff and the White Star Line; naval architect Thomas Andrews, the managing director of Harland and Wolff's design department; Edward Wilding, Andrews' deputy and responsible for calculating the ship's design, stability and trim; and Alexander Carlisle, the shipyard's chief draughtsman and general manager. Carlisle's responsibilities included the decorations, equipment and all general arrangements, including the implementation of an efficient lifeboat davit design.

On 29 July 1908, Harland and Wolff presented the drawings to Bruce Ismay and other White Star Line executives. Ismay approved the design and signed three "letters of agreement" two days later authorising the start of construction. At this point the first ship – which was later to become Olympic – had no name, but was referred to simply as "Number 400", as it was Harland and Wolff's four hundredth hull. Titanic was based on a revised version of the same design and was given the number 401. The senior Ismay died in 1899 and the order for the ship was cancelled.

Construction of Olympic began three months before Titanic to ease pressures on the shipyard. Several years would pass before Britannic would be launched. To accommodate the construction of the class, Harland and Wolff upgraded their facility in Belfast; the most dramatic change was the combining of three slipways into two larger ones. Olympic and Titanic were constructed side by side. Olympics keel was laid on 16 December 1908 and she was launched on 20 October 1910, without having been christened beforehand. By tradition, the White Star Line never christened any of their vessels and for the launch the hull was painted in a light grey colour for photographic purposes; a common practice of the day for the first ship in a new class, as it made the lines of the ship clearer in the black-and-white photographs. Her launch was filmed and the footage still survives. The launches of Titanic and Britannic were later filmed too, though only Britannic'''s survived. Her hull was repainted black following the launch. The ship was then dry-docked for her fitting out.Olympic was driven by three propellers. The two three-bladed side propellers were driven by two triple-expansion engines, while the four-bladed central propeller was driven by a turbine that used recovered steam escaping from the triple-expansion engines. The use of escaped steam was tested on the  two years earlier.

LifeboatsOlympic's lifeboat arrangement in 1911–12 was identical to Titanic'sfourteen regulation boats, two emergency cutters and the White Star complement of four collapsible boats. Two collapsibles were stored (collapsible C and D) broken down under the lead boats on the port and starboard sides. The final two collapsibles were stored on the top of the officers' quarters on either side of the number one funnel. Collapsible lifeboat B was stored on the port side roof of the officers quarters and collapsible lifeboat A was on the starboard side on the roof of the officers quarters.

 Features Olympic was designed as a luxury ship; Titanic's passenger facilities, fittings, deck plans and technical facilities were largely identical to Olympic, although with some small variations. The first-class passengers enjoyed luxurious cabins, and some were equipped with private bathrooms. First-class passengers could have meals in the ship's large and luxurious dining saloon or in the more intimate A La Carte Restaurant. There was a lavish Grand Staircase, built only for the Olympic-class ships, along with three lifts that ran behind the staircase down to E deck, a Georgian-style smoking room, a Veranda Café decorated with palm trees, a swimming pool, Turkish bath, gymnasium, and several other places for meals and entertainment.

The second-class facilities included a smoking room, a library, a spacious dining room, and a lift.New York Times – Olympic Like A City – 18 June 1911 encyclopedia-titanica.org

Finally, the third-class passengers enjoyed reasonable accommodation compared to other ships, if not up to the second and first classes. Instead of large dormitories offered by most ships of the time, the third-class passengers of Olympic travelled in cabins containing two to ten bunks. Facilities for the third class included a smoking room, a common area, and a dining room.Olympic had a cleaner, sleeker look than other ships of the day: rather than fitting her with bulky exterior air vents, Harland and Wolff used smaller air vents with electric fans, with a "dummy" fourth funnel used for additional ventilation. For the power plant Harland and Wolff employed a combination of reciprocating engines with a centre low-pressure turbine, as opposed to the steam turbines used on Cunard's Lusitania and Mauretania. White Star had successfully tested this engine set up on an earlier liner , where it was found to be more economical than expansion engines or turbines alone. Olympic consumed 650 tons of coal per 24 hours with an average speed of 21.7 knots on her maiden voyage, compared to 1000 tons of coal per 24 hours for both Lusitania and Mauretania.

Differences from Titanic

The Olympic and Titanic were nearly identical, and were based on the same core design. A few alterations were made to Titanic and later on Britannic which were based on experience gained from Olympics first year in service. The most noticeable of these was that the forward half of Titanics A Deck promenade was enclosed by a steel screen with sliding windows, to provide additional shelter, whereas Olympics promenade deck remained open along its whole length. The additional weight was a major contributor to Titanics increased gross register tonnage of 46,328 tons over Olympics 45,324 tons, which allowed Titanic to claim the title of largest ship in the world.

Additionally, the B-Deck First-Class promenade decks installed on Olympic had proven to be scarcely used because of the already ample promenade space on A-Deck. Accordingly, Thomas Andrews eliminated this feature on Titanic and built additional, enlarged staterooms with en-suite bathrooms. It also allowed a Café Parisien in the style of a French sidewalk café to be added as an annexe to the À la Carte Restaurant, and for the Restaurant itself to be expanded to the Port-side of the ship. One drawback of this was that the Second-Class promenade space on B-Deck was reduced aboard Titanic.

A reception area for the restaurant was added in the foyer of the B-Deck aft Grand Staircase on Titanic, which did not exist on Olympic, and the main reception room on D-Deck was also slightly enlarged.  private promenade decks were added to the two luxury parlour suites on B-Deck on Titanic, as well as additional First-Class gangway entrances on B-Deck. Cosmetic differences also existed between the two ships, most noticeably concerning the wider use of Axminster carpeting in Titanics public rooms, as opposed to the more durable linoleum flooring on Olympic.

Most of these shortcomings on Olympic would be addressed in her 1913 refit, which altered the configuration of Olympics First-Class sections to be more like those of Titanic. Although the A-Deck Promenade remained open for the entirety of Olympics career, the B-Deck promenade was vetoed and staterooms added like those on Titanic, as well as a Café Parisien and enlarged restaurant. The 1913 refit also included modifications for greater safety after the loss of the Titanic, including the addition of extra lifeboats and the addition of an inner watertight skin in the hull along about half the length of the ship. An extra watertight compartment was added bringing the total of watertight compartments to 17. Five watertight bulkheads were raised to B deck. Along with these improvements there were many others included in the 1913 refit.

 Career 
Following completion, Olympic started her sea trials on 29 May 1911 during which her manoeuvrability, compass, and wireless telegraphy were tested. No speed test was carried out. She completed her sea trial successfully. Olympic then left Belfast bound for Liverpool, her port of registration, on 31 May 1911. As a publicity stunt the White Star Line timed the start of this first voyage to coincide with the launch of Titanic. After spending a day in Liverpool, open to the public, Olympic sailed to Southampton, where she arrived on 3 June, to be made ready for her maiden voyage.. Her arrival generated enthusiasm from her crew and newspapers. The deep-water dock at Southampton, then known as the "White Star Dock" had been specially constructed to accommodate the new Olympic-class liners, and had opened in 1911.

Her maiden voyage commenced on 14 June 1911 from Southampton, calling at Cherbourg and Queenstown, reaching New York City on 21 June. The maiden voyage was captained by Edward Smith who would perish the following year in the Titanic disaster. Designer Thomas Andrews was present for the passage to New York and return, along with a number of engineers with Bruce Ismay and Harland and Wolff's "Guarantee Group" who were also aboard for them to spot any problems or areas for improvement. Andrews would also lose his life in the Titanic disaster.

As the largest ship in the world, and the first in a new class of superliners, Olympics maiden voyage attracted considerable worldwide attention from the press and public. Following her arrival in New York, Olympic was opened up to the public and received over 8,000 visitors. More than 10,000 spectators watched her depart from New York harbour, for her first return trip.

 Hawke collision Olympics first major mishap occurred on her fifth voyage on 20 September 1911, when she collided with the British cruiser . The collision took place as Olympic and Hawke were running parallel to each other through the Solent. As Olympic turned to starboard, the wide radius of her turn took the commander of Hawke by surprise, and he was unable to take sufficient avoiding action. Hawkes bow, which had been designed to sink ships by ramming them, collided with Olympics starboard side near the stern, tearing two large holes in Olympics hull, above and below the waterline, resulting in the flooding of two of her watertight compartments and a twisted propeller shaft. Olympic settled slightly by the stern,  but in spite of the damage was able to return to Southampton under her own power; no one was killed or seriously injured. HMS Hawke suffered severe damage to her bow and nearly capsized; she was repaired, but sunk by the German U-boat  in October 1914.

Captain Edward Smith was in command of Olympic at the time of the incident. Two crew members, stewardess Violet Jessop and stoker Arthur John Priest, survived not only the collision with Hawke but also the later sinking of Titanic and the 1916 sinking of Britannic, the third ship of the class..

At the subsequent inquiry the Royal Navy blamed Olympic for the incident, alleging that her large displacement generated a suction that pulled Hawke into her side. The Hawke incident was a financial disaster for Olympics operator. A legal argument ensued which decided that the blame for the incident lay with Olympic, and although the ship was technically under the control of the harbour pilot, the White Star Line was faced with large legal bills and the cost of repairing the ship, and keeping her out of revenue service made matters worse.« Maiden Voyage – Collision With HMS Hawke » , RMS Olympic archive. Accessed 21 May 2009. However, the fact that Olympic endured such a serious collision and stayed afloat, appeared to vindicate the design of the Olympic-class liners and reinforced their "unsinkable" reputation.

It took two weeks for the damage to Olympic to be patched up sufficiently to allow her to return to Belfast for permanent repairs, which took just over six weeks to complete. To expedite repairs, Harland and Wolff was obliged to replace Olympics damaged propeller shaft with one from Titanic, delaying the latter's completion. By 20 November 1911 Olympic was back in service, but, on 24 February 1912, suffered another setback when she lost a propeller blade on an eastbound voyage from New York, and once again returned to her builder for repairs. To return her to service as soon as possible, Harland & Wolff again had to pull resources from Titanic, delaying her maiden voyage by three weeks, from 20 March to 10 April 1912.

 Titanic disaster 

On 14 April 1912, Olympic, now under the command of Herbert James Haddock, was on a return trip from New York. Wireless operator Ernest James Moore received the distress call from Titanic, when she was approximately 505 miles west by south of Titanics location. Haddock calculated a new course, ordered the ship's engines to be set to full power and headed to assist in the rescue.

Rostron explained that Olympic continuing on course to Titanic would gain nothing, as "All boats accounted for. About 675 souls saved [...] Titanic foundered about 2:20 am." Rostron requested that the message be forwarded to White Star and Cunard. He said that he was returning to harbour in New York. Subsequently, the wireless room aboard Olympic operated as a clearing room for radio messages.

When Olympic offered to take on the survivors, she was turned down by Rostron under order from Ismay, who was concerned that asking the survivors to board a virtual mirror-image of Titanic would cause them distress. Olympic then resumed her voyage to Southampton, with all concerts cancelled as a mark of respect, arriving on 21 April..

Over the next few months, Olympic assisted with both the American and British inquiries into the disaster. Deputations from both inquiries inspected Olympics lifeboats, watertight doors and bulkheads and other equipment which were identical to those on Titanic. Sea tests were performed for the British enquiry in May 1912, to establish how quickly the ship could turn two points at various speeds, to approximate how long it would have taken Titanic to turn after the iceberg was sighted.

 1912 strikeOlympic, like Titanic, did not carry enough lifeboats for everyone on board, and so was hurriedly equipped with additional, second-hand collapsible lifeboats following her return to Britain. Towards the end of April 1912, as she was about to sail from Southampton to New York, 284 of the ship's firemen went on strike, for fear that the ship's new collapsible lifeboats were not seaworthy. 100 non-union crew were hastily hired from Southampton as replacements, with more being hired from Liverpool.

The 40 collapsible lifeboats were transferred from troopships and put on Olympic, and many were rotten and would not open. The crewmen, instead, sent a request to the Southampton manager of the White Star Line that the collapsible boats be replaced by wooden lifeboats; the manager replied that this was impossible and that the collapsible boats had been passed as seaworthy by a Board of Trade inspector. The men were not satisfied and ceased work in protest.

On 25 April, a deputation of strikers witnessed a test of four of the collapsible boats. One was unseaworthy and the deputation said that it was prepared to recommend the men return to work if the boat were replaced. However, the strikers now objected to the non-union strikebreaker crew which had come on board, and demanded that they be dismissed, which the White Star Line refused. 54 sailors then left the ship, objecting to the non-union crew who they claimed were unqualified and therefore dangerous, and refused to sail with them. This led to the scheduled sailing being cancelled.

All 54 sailors were arrested on a charge of mutiny when they went ashore. On 4 May 1912, Portsmouth magistrates found the charges against the mutineers were proven, but discharged them without imprisonment or fine, due to the special circumstances of the case. Fearing that public opinion would be on the side of the strikers, the White Star Line let them return to work and Olympic sailed on 15 May.

 Post-Titanic refit 

On 9 October 1912, White Star withdrew Olympic from service and returned her to her builders at Belfast to have modifications added to incorporate lessons learned from the Titanic disaster six months prior, and improve safety. The number of lifeboats carried by Olympic was increased from twenty to sixty-eight, and extra davits were installed along the boat deck to accommodate them. An inner watertight skin was also constructed in the boiler and engine rooms, which created a double hull. Five of the watertight bulkheads were extended up to B-Deck, extending to the entire height of the hull. This corrected a flaw in the original design, in which the bulkheads only rose up as far as E or D-Deck, a short distance above the waterline. This flaw had been exposed during Titanics sinking, where water spilled over the top of the bulkheads as the ship sank and flooded subsequent compartments. In addition, an extra bulkhead was added to subdivide the electrical dynamo room, bringing the total number of watertight compartments to seventeen. Improvements were also made to the ship's pumping apparatus. These modifications meant that Olympic could survive a collision similar to that of Titanic, in that her first six compartments could be breached and the ship could remain afloat.

At the same time, Olympics B Deck underwent a refit, which included extra cabins, more private bathing facilities, an enlarged Á La Carte restaurant, and a Café Parisien (another addition that had proved popular on Titanic) was added, offering another dining option to first class passengers. With these changes (and a second refit in 1919 after the war), Olympics gross register tonnage rose to 46,439 tons, 111 tons more than Titanics.List of on board facilities from the Passenger List (First Class) for the White Star Lines steamer RMS "Olympic" for April 28, 1923 voyage from New York to Southampton.  pp. 9-10

In March 1913, Olympic returned to service and briefly regained the title of largest ocean liner in the world, until the German liner  entered passenger service in June 1913. Following her refit, Olympic was marketed as the "new" Olympic and her improved safety features were featured prominently in advertisements. The ship experienced a short period of tranquility despite a storm in 1914 that broke some of the First Class windows and injured some passengers.

 First World War 
On 4 August 1914, Britain entered the First World War. Olympic initially remained in commercial service under Captain Herbert James Haddock. As a wartime measure, Olympic was painted in a grey colour scheme, portholes were blocked, and lights on deck were turned off to make the ship less visible. The schedule was hastily altered to terminate at Liverpool rather than Southampton, and this was later altered again to Glasgow.

The first few wartime voyages were packed with Americans trapped in Europe, eager to return home, although the eastbound journeys carried few passengers. By mid-October, bookings had fallen sharply as the threat from German U-boats became increasingly serious, and White Star Line decided to withdraw Olympic from commercial service. On 21 October 1914, she left New York for Glasgow on her last commercial voyage of the war, though carrying only 153 passengers.

 Audacious incident 

On the sixth day of her voyage, 27 October, as Olympic passed near Lough Swilly off the north coast of Ireland, she received distress signals from the battleship , which had struck a mine off Tory Island and was taking on water. HMS Liverpool was in the company of Audacious.Olympic took off 250 of Audaciouss crew, then the destroyer  managed to attach a tow cable between Audacious and Olympic and they headed west for Lough Swilly. However, the cable parted after Audaciouss steering gear failed. A second attempt was made to tow the warship, but the cable became tangled in 's propellers and was severed. A third attempt was tried but also failed when the cable gave way. By 17:00 the Audaciouss quarterdeck was awash and it was decided to evacuate the remaining crew members to Olympic and Liverpool, and at 20:55 there was an explosion aboard Audacious and she sank.

Admiral Sir John Jellicoe, Commander of the Home Fleet, was anxious to suppress the news of the sinking of Audacious, for fear of the demoralising effect it could have on the British public, so he ordered Olympic to be held in custody at Lough Swilly. No communications were permitted and passengers were not allowed to leave the ship. Steel tycoon Charles M. Schwab, who was travelling aboard the liner, sent word to Jellicoe that he had urgent business in London with the Admiralty, and Jellicoe agreed to release Schwab if he remained silent about the fate of Audacious. Finally, on 2 November, Olympic was allowed to go to Belfast where the passengers disembarked.

 Naval service 

The Admiralty had initially been reluctant to use large ocean liners as troop transports because of their vulnerability to enemy attack; however, a shortage of ships gave them little choice. At the same time, Olympics other sister ship Britannic, which had not yet been completed, was requisitioned as a hospital ship. Operating in that role she would strike a German naval mine and sink in the Aegean Sea on 21 November 1916.

Stripped of her peacetime fittings and now armed with 12-pounders and 4.7-inch guns, Olympic was converted to a troopship, with the capacity to transport up to 6,000 troops. On 24 September 1915 the newly designated HMT (Hired Military Transport) 2810, now under the command of Bertram Fox Hayes, left Liverpool carrying 6,000 soldiers to Mudros, Greece for the Gallipoli Campaign. On 1 October lifeboats from the French ship Provincia which had been sunk by a U-boat that morning off Cape Matapan were sighted and 34 survivors rescued by Olympic. Hayes was criticised for this action by the British Admiralty, who accused him of putting the ship in danger by stopping her in waters where enemy U-boats were active. The ship's speed was considered to be her best defence against U-boat attack, and such a large ship stopped would have made an unmissable target. However, the French Vice-Admiral Louis Dartige du Fournet took a different view, and awarded Hayes with the Gold Medal of Honour. Olympic made several more trooping journeys to the Mediterranean until early 1916, when the Gallipoli Campaign was abandoned.

In 1916, considerations were made to use Olympic to transport troops to India via the Cape of Good Hope. However, on investigation it was decided that the ship was unsuitable for this role, because the coal bunkers, which had been designed for transatlantic runs, lacked the capacity for such a long journey at a reasonable speed. Instead, from 1916 to 1917, Olympic was chartered by the Canadian Government to transport troops from Halifax, Nova Scotia to Britain. In 1917 she gained 6-inch guns and was painted with a dazzle camouflage scheme to make it more difficult for observers to estimate her speed and heading. Her dazzle colours were brown, dark blue, light blue, and white. Her many visits to Halifax Harbour carrying Canadian troops safely overseas, and back home after the war at Pier 2, made her a favourite symbol in the city of Halifax. Noted Group of Seven artist Arthur Lismer made several paintings of her in Halifax. A large dance hall, the "Olympic Gardens" was also named in her honour. After the United States declared war on Germany in 1917, Olympic also transported thousands of American troops to Britain.

Attack on U-103
In the early hours of 12 May 1918, while en route for France in the English Channel with U.S. troops under the command of Captain Hayes, Olympic sighted a surfaced U-boat  ahead. Almost immediately afterwards Olympic struck the submarine just aft of her conning tower with her port propeller slicing through 's pressure hull. The crew of U-103 blew her ballast tanks, scuttled and abandoned the submarine. Olympic did not stop to pick up survivors, but continued on to Cherbourg. Meanwhile,  had sighted a distress flare and picked up 31 survivors from U-103. Olympic returned to Southampton with at least two hull plates dented and her prow twisted to one side, but not breached.

It was subsequently discovered that U-103 had been preparing to torpedo Olympic when she was sighted, but the crew were not able to flood the two stern torpedo tubes. For his service, Captain Hayes was awarded the DSO. Some American soldiers on board paid for a plaque to be placed in one of Olympics lounges to commemorate the event, it read:

This tablet presented by the 59th Regiment United States Infantry commemorates the sinking of the German submarine U103 by Olympic on May 12th 1918 in latitude 49 degrees 16 minutes north longitude 4 degrees 51 minutes west on the voyage from New York to Southampton with American troops... Olympics war service earned her the nickname Old Reliable. Her captain was knighted in 1919 for "valuable services in connection with the transport of troops".

 Post-war 

In August 1919 Olympic returned to Belfast for restoration to civilian service. The interiors were modernised and the boilers were converted to oil firing rather than coal burning. This modification would reduce the refuelling time from days to 5 or 6 hours; it also gave a steadier engine R.P.M and allowed the engine room personnel to be reduced from 350 to 60 people. During the conversion work and drydocking, a dent with a crack at the centre was discovered below her waterline which was later concluded to have been caused by a torpedo that had failed to detonate.. The historian Mark Chirnside concluded that the faulty torpedo had been fired by the U-boat SM U-53 on 4 September 1918, while Olympic was in the English Channel.Olympic emerged from refit with an increased tonnage of 46,439, allowing her to retain her claim to the title of largest British built liner afloat, although the Cunard Lines  was slightly longer. On 25 June 1920 she returned to passenger service, on one voyage that year carrying 2,249 passengers. Olympic transported a record 38,000 passengers during 1921, which proved to be the peak year of her career.

During the 1920s, Olympic remained a popular and fashionable ship, and often attracted the rich and famous of the day; Marie Curie, Charlie Chaplin, Mary Pickford and Douglas Fairbanks, and Prince Edward, then Prince of Wales, were among the celebrities that she carried. Prince Edward and Captain Howarth were filmed on the bridge of Olympic for Pathé News. According to his autobiography, and confirmed by US Immigration records, Cary Grant, then 16-year-old Archibald Leach, first set sail to New York on Olympic on 21 July 1920 on the same voyage on which Douglas Fairbanks and Mary Pickford were celebrating their honeymoon. One of the attractions of Olympic was the fact that she was nearly identical to Titanic, and many passengers sailed on Olympic as a way of vicariously experiencing the voyage of her sister ship.
On 22 March 1924, Olympic was involved in another collision with a ship, this time at New York. As Olympic was reversing from her berth at New York harbour, her stern collided with the smaller liner Fort St George, which had crossed into her path. The collision caused extensive damage to the smaller ship. At first it appeared that Olympic had sustained only minor damage, but it was later revealed that her sternpost had been fractured, necessitating the replacement of her entire stern frame.

Changes in immigration laws in the United States in the 1920s greatly restricted the number of immigrants allowed to enter. The law limited the number of immigrants to about 160,000 per year in 1924. This led to a major reduction in the immigrant trade for the shipping lines, forcing them to cater to the tourist trade to survive. At the turn of 1927–28, Olympic was converted to carry tourist third cabin passengers as well as first, second and third class. Tourist third cabin was an attempt to attract travellers who desired comfort without the accompanying high ticket price. New public rooms were constructed for this class, although tourist third cabin and second class would merge to become 'tourist' by late 1931.

A year later, Olympics first-class cabins were again improved by adding more bathrooms, a dance floor was fitted in the enlarged first-class dining saloon, and a number of new suites with private facilities were installed forward on B deck. More improvements would follow in a later refit, but 1929 saw Olympics best average passenger lists since 1925.

On 18 November 1929, as Olympic was travelling westbound near to Titanics last known position, the ship suddenly started to vibrate violently, and the vibrations continued for two minutes. It was later determined that this had been caused by the 1929 Grand Banks earthquake.

 Last years 

The shipping trade was badly affected by the Great Depression. Until 1930 there had generally been around one million passengers a year on the transatlantic route, but by 1934 this had dropped by more than half. During slack periods in the summer, Olympic and fleet mate Majestic were employed in summer recreational cruises from New York to Pier 21 in Halifax, Nova Scotia.

At the end of 1932, with passenger traffic in decline, Olympic went for an overhaul and refit that took four months. She returned to service on 5 March 1933 described by her owners as "looking like new." Passenger capacities were given as 618 first class, 447 tourist class and only 382 third class after the decline of the immigrant trade.

Despite this, during 1933 and 1934, Olympic ran at a net operating loss for the first time. 1933 was Olympics worst year of business – carrying just over 9,000 passengers in total. Passenger numbers rose slightly in 1934, but many crossings still lost money.

 Nantucket lightship collision 

In 1934, Olympic again struck another ship. The approaches to New York were marked by lightships and Olympic, like other liners, had been known to pass close by these vessels. On 15 May 1934 (11:06 AM), Olympic, inbound in heavy fog, was homing in on the radio beacon of Nantucket Lightship LV-117. Now under the command of Captain John W. Binks, the ship failed to turn in time and sliced through the smaller vessel, which broke apart and sank. Four of the lightship's crew went down with the vessel and seven were rescued, of whom three died of their injuries – thus there were seven fatalities out of a crew of eleven. The lightship's surviving crew and Olympics captain were interviewed soon after reaching shore. One crewman said it all happened so quickly that they did not know how it happened. The captain was very sorry it happened but said Olympic reacted very quickly lowering boats to rescue the crew, which was confirmed by an injured crewman.

 Retirement 

In 1934, the White Star Line merged with the Cunard Line at the instigation of the British government, to form Cunard White Star. When completed, these two new ships would handle Cunard White Star's express service; so their fleet of older liners became redundant and were gradually retired.Olympic was withdrawn from the transatlantic service, and left New York for the last time on 5 April 1935, returning to Britain to be laid up in Southampton. The new company considered using her for summer cruises for a short while, but this idea was abandoned and she was put up for sale. Among the potential buyers was a syndicate who proposed to turn her into a floating hotel off the south coast of France, but this came to nothing.

After being laid up for five months alongside her former rival , she was sold to Sir John Jarvis – Member of Parliament – for £97,500, to be partially demolished at Jarrow to provide work for the depressed region. On 11 October 1935, Olympic left Southampton for the last time and arrived in Jarrow two days later. The scrapping began after the ship's fittings were auctioned off. Between 1935 and 1937, Olympics superstructure was demolished, and then on 19 September 1937, her hull was towed to Thos. W. Ward's yard at Inverkeithing for final demolition which was finished by late 1937. At that time, the ship's chief engineer commented, "I could understand the necessity if the 'Old Lady' had lost her efficiency, but the engines are as sound as they ever were".

By the time of her retirement, Olympic had completed 257 round trips across the Atlantic, transporting 430,000 passengers on her commercial voyages, travelling 1.8 million miles.RMS Olympic: Another Premature Death? – Mark Chirnside  – encyclopaedia-titanica.org

 Olympics artefacts Olympics fittings were auctioned off before the scrapping commenced.

The fittings of the first-class lounge and part of the aft grand staircase can be found in the White Swan Hotel, in Alnwick, Northumberland, England. A variety of panelling, light fixtures, flooring, doors, and windows from Olympic were installed in a paint factory in Haltwhistle, Northumberland, until they were auctioned in 2004. One suite at Sparth House Hotel, Clayton-le-Moors, Lancashire has the furniture from one of the staterooms, including light fitting, sink, wardrobes and fireplace. The crystal and ormolu electrolier from the lounge is installed in the Cutlers' Hall in Sheffield. Some of the timber panelling was used in the extension (completed in 1937) of St John the Baptist's Catholic Church in Padiham, Lancashire.

In 2000, Celebrity Cruises purchased some of Olympics original wooden panels to create the "RMS Olympic Restaurant" on board their new cruise ship, . According to the cruise line, this panelling had lined Olympics À la Carte restaurant.Olympics bridge bell is on display at the Titanic Historical Society in Indian Orchard, Springfield, Massachusetts.

The clock depicting "Honour and Glory Crowning Time" from Olympics grand staircase is on display at Southampton's SeaCity Museum.

In 1912, a Steinway Vertegrand upright piano No.157550 with a quartered walnut case left the Steinway Hamburg factory unfinished and was sent to its London branch. In 1913, it was decorated by Harland & Wolff's interior decoration company Aldam Heaton & Co with carvings and gold accents. The Steinway Vertegrand from the Olympic is now at Besbrode Pianos in Leeds.

In 2017, the old billiard hall at 44 Priestpopple, Hexham, Northumberland, was demolished. During an archaeological excavation on the demolition site by AAG Archaeology, one of the Olympics chairs was recovered. The fittings from Olympic were auctioned off over ten days in November 1935 at the Palmers Works in Jarrow, the billiard hall opened in 1936.

 Identification Olympics UK official number was 131346. Official numbers were issued by individual flag states; they should not be confused with IMO numbers.

Until 1933 Olympics code letters were HSRP and her wireless telegraphy call sign was MKC. In 1934 new four-letter call signs superseded code letters and three-letter call signs. Olympics new call sign was GLSQ.

 See also 
  – surviving tender to Olympic , a German passenger ship that, like RMS Olympic'', collided with a ship of The Royal Navy (and like RMS Titanic collided with an iceberg).

References

Citations

Bibliography

Further reading 

 
 
 Layton, J. Kent, Atlantic Liners: A Trio of Trios

External links 

 Olympic Home at Atlantic Liners
 Pathé News gallery on the Olympic class
 Video of Olympic under steam in Southampton March 28, 1928

1910 ships
Four funnel liners
Olympic-class ocean liners
Passenger ships of the United Kingdom
Ships built by Harland and Wolff
Ships built in Belfast
RMS Titanic
Steamships
Troop ships of the United Kingdom
Maritime incidents in 1934
Maritime incidents in 1911
World War I Auxiliary cruisers of the Royal Navy